Horst Löffler (born 17 March 1942 in Langenau) is a German former swimmer who competed in the 1964 Summer Olympics.

References

1942 births
Living people
German male swimmers
German male freestyle swimmers
Olympic swimmers of the United Team of Germany
Swimmers at the 1964 Summer Olympics
Olympic silver medalists for the United Team of Germany
Medalists at the 1964 Summer Olympics
Olympic silver medalists in swimming
20th-century German people
21st-century German people